Ny-Friesland is the land area between Wijdefjorden and Hinlopen Strait on Spitsbergen, Svalbard.

The area is named after the Dutch province of Friesland.

References

Peninsulas of Spitsbergen